Princess Sudawadi, the Princess Yothathep (1656–1735) was the only child of Narai and Princess Suriyong Ratsami, one of his concubines. She lived through five reigns and died in the reign of King Borommakot.

Biography
Chaofa Princess Krom Luang Yothathep was the only daughter and only child of Narai and Queen Kasattri, one of his concubines. During her father's reign, she took over many duties about the palace when her mother died, such as caring for the ladies in-waiting and eunuchs. The highest honor she was a Royal master's degree.

During the reign of King Phetracha, she married the King and received the title of Left Consort, but she disapproved of King Phetracha because he had ordered his guards to kill her father's brothers. King Phetracha later married Princess Sisuphan, the Princess Yothathip, who was her father's sister, and promoted Princess Sisuphan to Right Consort.

Death
After the death of Phetracha, Suriyenthrathibodi, the secret son of King Narai and Princess Kusavadi of Chiangmai adopted by King Phetracha, stole the throne of Ayutthaya from Prince Khwan, son of King Phetracha and Princess Sisuphan. Princess Sudawadi and her son, Prince Tratnoi, moved out to live with her relatives. She lived peacefully and died in 1735 during the reign of King Borommakot.

References

1656 births
1735 deaths
Thai princesses
Place of birth missing
Prasat Thong dynasty
Ban Phlu Luang dynasty
18th-century Thai people
17th-century Thai people
18th-century Thai women
17th-century Thai women
Thai princesses consort
Thai female Chao Fa